RTGS may refer to:

Real-time gross settlement
Royal Thai General System of Transcription
RTGS Dollar, Zimbabwe's currency since 2019